Ramsey Town F.C. is an English football club based in Ramsey, Cambridgeshire.

History
Established in 1880, the club won the Hunts Junior Cup in 1908–09 and the Hunts Senior Cup the following season. They were champions of Division One of the Peterborough & District League in 1959–60 and won the Peterborough Senior Cup four times between 1969 and 1982.

The club joined Division One of the United Counties League in 1985 and won the Senior Cup again during their first season in the league. They enjoyed consistent success in the division, winning it in 1988–89 (but were denied promotion due to their ground being deemed inadequate for the Premier Division), and never finishing lower than sixth in their first eight seasons in the league. They also won the Senior Cup for a third time in 1989–90, but resigned from the league during the 1996–97 season.

The club returned to the Peterborough & District League, winning the Premier Division in 2008–09 and 2010–11. After finishing sixteenth in 2013–14, the club's first team folded, and the reserves, who had just been relegated to Division Three, became the new first team.

Honours
United Counties League
Division One champions 1988–89
Peterborough & District League
Premier Division champions 2008–09, 2010–11
Division One champions 1959–60
Division Two champions 2016–17
Hunts Senior Cup
Winners 1909–10, 1985–86, 1989–90
Hunts Junior Cup
Winners 1908–09, 1998–99

Records
Best FA Vase performance: First round replay, 1990–91

References

 
Football clubs in England
Football clubs in Cambridgeshire
Association football clubs established in 1880
1880 establishments in England
Peterborough and District Football League
United Counties League
Ramsey, Cambridgeshire